Christel Thoresen  (born 15 August 1980) is a retired Norwegian snowboarder. 

She was born in Oslo, but represented the club Bærums SK.

She won a silver medal in halfpipe at the FIS Snowboarding World Championships 1997. She competed at the 1998 Winter Olympics, in women's halfpipe.

References

External links 
 

1980 births
Living people
Sportspeople from Bærum
Norwegian female snowboarders
Olympic snowboarders of Norway
Snowboarders at the 1998 Winter Olympics
20th-century Norwegian women